The Eastampton Township School District is a comprehensive community public school district that serves students in kindergarten through eighth grade from Eastampton Township, in Burlington County, New Jersey, United States.

As of the 2020–21 school year, the district, comprised of one school, had an enrollment of 561 students and 46.2 classroom teachers (on an FTE basis), for a student–teacher ratio of 12.1:1.

The district is classified by the New Jersey Department of Education as being in District Factor Group "FG", the fourth-highest of eight groupings. District Factor Groups organize districts statewide to allow comparison by common socioeconomic characteristics of the local districts. From lowest socioeconomic status to highest, the categories are A, B, CD, DE, FG, GH, I and J.

As of the 2020–21 school year, the high school had an enrollment of 2,069 students and 139.6 classroom teachers (on an FTE basis), for a student–teacher ratio of 14.8:1.

Schools
Schools in the district (with 2020–21 enrollment data from the National Center for Education Statistics) are:
Eastampton Community School, with 548 students in grades K-8
Ambrose F. Duckett III, Principal
Brianna Rucci, Supervisor of Curriculum
Michael A. Herman, Assistant Principal

Administration
Core members of the district's administration are:
Ambrose F. Duckett III, Superintendent
Pat Austin, Interim Business Administrator / Board Secretary

Board of education
The district's board of education has seven members who set policy and oversee the fiscal and educational operation of the district through its administration. As a Type II school district, the board's trustees are elected directly by voters to serve three-year terms of office on a staggered basis, with either two or three seats up for election each year held (since 2012) as part of the November general election. The board appoints a superintendent to oversee the district's day-to-day operations and a business administrator to supervise the business functions of the district.

References

External links
Eastampton Township School District

Eastampton Township School District, National Center for Education Statistics

Eastampton Township, New Jersey
New Jersey District Factor Group FG
School districts in Burlington County, New Jersey
Public K–8 schools in New Jersey